René Closter (born 15 December 1952 in Wiltz, Luxembourg) is founder and chairman of the board of directors of Luxembourg Air Rescue (LAR) and Executive Board Member of Luxembourg Air Ambulance (LAA).

Career 
Electro-Technician by profession, René Closter started his working career in 1973 within the professional fire brigade of the City of Luxembourg. After having started studies again in business management, he became a senior manager in the financial services sector with positions in London, Hong Kong and New York City.  

René Closter is inextricably linked to the development of air rescue operations in Luxembourg. On 1 July 1995, he was officially nominated as CEO of LAR, a position which he held until 1 May 2021.

Today 
The former firefighter and pilot is today a member of ING's external advisory board and VP of DRF Luftrettung.

In 2015, René Closter was awarded the prize of the Foundation of the Deutsche Bank Luxembourg S.A. for the support of the German-Luxembourgish cooperation in the area of the sciences.

He was appointed "Knight of the Crown of the Order of Adolphe of Nassau" and in June 2021 "Officer in the Order of Civil and Military Merit of Adolph of Nassau" by H.R.H. the Grand Duke of Luxembourg. In addition, he was awarded the title of "Officer in the Order of the Crown" by King Albert II of Belgium.

References

External links 
 https://www.lar.lu/en
 https://paperjam.lu/guide/biography/0587753273/rene-closter
 https://www.lar.lu/site/ebook/en/index.html
 http://www.ehac.eu
 http://www.itij.co.uk/ : ITIJ Issue 124, Blazing a trail in the industry, International Travel Insurance Journal
 LAR report “Die LAR A.s.b.l. – Erfolgsgeschichte mit schwerem Start“ Ausgabe März 2012, S. 22 f.
 Luxemburger Wort, 22 July 2013, page 15: "Sous le signe du changement de règne"
 https://www.duke.lu/renecloster
 https://delano.lu/d/detail/news/celebrating-luxembourg-air-rescue/157558
 http://inspiring-speaker.com/speakers/rene-closter-speaker/

20th-century Luxembourgian people
Living people
Luxembourgian businesspeople
1952 births